Eravimangalam is a village in thrissur district Kerala, India. The village takes the credit as the first village in India where blood group of every person has been determined  (Blood Group-Literacy).

References

Villages in Thrissur district